Neurotoma is a genus of insects belonging to the family Pamphiliidae.

The species of this genus are found in Europe, Southeastern Asia and Northern America.

Species:
 Neurotoma atrata Takeuchi, 1930 
 Neurotoma edwardi Liston, 1996
 Neurotoma mandibularis Zaddach, 1866
 Neurotoma saltuum Linnaeus

References

Pamphiliidae
Hymenoptera genera